The International Journal of Men's Health was a triannual peer-reviewed academic journal which was published by Men's Studies Press from 2002 until 2016. It covered all aspects of men's health. The editor-in-chief was Steve Robertson (Leeds Metropolitan University). The journal was abstracted and indexed in Scopus.

References

External links 

General medical journals
Men's health
Men's studies journals
Publications established in 2002
2002 establishments in the United States
Triannual journals
English-language journals